Richard Kohn (27 February 1888 – 16 June 1963) was an Austrian football player and later coach of FC Bayern Munich, FC Barcelona and Feyenoord Rotterdam. He was Jewish, born in Vienna. His nickname was Dombi or Little Dombi, meaning little eminence. He was also known as John Little(s), Jack Domby, De hongaarse wonderdokter (the Hungarian wonder doctor), and Ricardo Domby.

Career as player
Before World War I he played for Wiener AC and Wiener AF and Wiener Amateur SV. Kohn was renowned for his good technique. He had seven appearances for the Austria national football team (1907–1912) and scored two times.
He scored for WAF when they played Middlesex Wanderers on 26 May 1912. He was also part of Austria's squad for the football tournament at the 1912 Summer Olympics, but he did not play in any matches.

Career as coach
Little is known about the early years of his career. In the 1920s he managed Građanski Zagreb and Sportfreunde Stuttgart and Hertha BSC from 1924 to 1925. He then went to First Vienna FC which he left for Barcelona for a first stint from February 1926 to 1927. He afterwards left TSV 1860 Munich for VfR Mannheim for a year. Upon leaving for FC Bayern Munich, convincing the gifted player Oskar Rohr to follow him there. With Rohr and Conny Heidkamp he formed a strong team in Munich and in 1932 won the German championship with Bayern in a final victory against Eintracht Frankfurt.

After the Nazis rise to power, the Jewish Kohn left Germany initially for the Grasshopper Club in Zurich  for Barcelona, and later went to Switzerland where he coached Basel. From 1935 to 1939, 1951 to 1952, and 1955 to 1956 he managed Feyenoord Rotterdam, winning the Dutch league in 1935–36 and 1937–38. He acted as a coach and physio, and was known for magical potions, which helped to cure injured players.

Statistics

International

International goals
''As of match played 22 August 1912. Austria score listed first, score column indicates score after each Richard goal.

See also
 Floor de Zeeuw – Kohn's assistant coach at Feyenoord

References

Further reading
 Andreas Wittner: "Richard Little Dombi – Kleine Eminenz, vom Himmel gesandt". In: Schulze-Marmeling, Dietrich (Hrsg.): "Strategen des Spiels – Die legendären Fußballtrainer", Verlag Die Werkstatt, Göttingen 2005, S.54–63

External links
 Biography Richard Dombi 

1888 births
1963 deaths
Association football midfielders
Austrian footballers
Austria international footballers
Austrian football managers
Austrian expatriate football managers
Jewish footballers
First Vienna FC managers
Hertha BSC managers
HŠK Građanski Zagreb managers
Expatriate football managers in Yugoslavia
Expatriate football managers in Spain
Expatriate football managers in Switzerland
FC Barcelona managers
TSV 1860 Munich managers
FC Bayern Munich managers
FC Basel managers
Feyenoord managers
Footballers from Vienna
Austrian Jews
Jewish emigrants from Nazi Germany to Switzerland
German expatriate sportspeople in the Netherlands
German expatriate sportspeople in Spain
VfR Mannheim managers
Place of death missing
SC Emma managers
EBOH managers
Grasshopper Club Zürich managers
Austrian expatriate sportspeople in the Netherlands
Austrian expatriate sportspeople in Spain
Austrian expatriate sportspeople in Yugoslavia
Austrian expatriate sportspeople in Switzerland
Austrian expatriate sportspeople in Germany